Great America may refer to:

 One of two American amusement parks originally built and operated by the Marriott Corporation in 1976, themed to America and America's history:
 California's Great America, Santa Clara, California, now owned by Cedar Fair
 Great America (VTA), a light rail station near this park
 Santa Clara – Great America station, an Amtrak station near this park
 Six Flags Great America, Gurnee, Illinois, now owned by Six Flags
 Marriott's Great America (Maryland–Virginia), originally planned as the flagship park for the Great America chain but cancelled in 1980 following opposition from local residents
 Great America (painting), a 1994 painting by Kerry James Marshall

See also

Great American (disambiguation)